Reserve Township may refer to the following townships in the United States:

 Reserve Township, Parke County, Indiana
 Reserve Township, Allegheny County, Pennsylvania